Kalapet is a legislative assembly constituency in the Union territory of Puducherry in India. Kalapet assembly constituency covers the enclave of Kalapet and is a part of the Puducherry (Lok Sabha constituency).

Members of Legislative Assembly

Election Result

2021 Assembly election

References

External links
 

Assembly constituencies of Puducherry